Joseph-Henri-Albiny Paquette (October 7, 1888 – September 25, 1978) was a Quebec politician and physician. He was a cabinet minister  for 17 years in Maurice Duplessis's Union Nationale government.

Biography 
Born in Marieville, Quebec, Paquette studied in medical sciences at the Montreal campus of Université Laval. After additional studies and training at Bellevue Hospital in New York City, Paquette worked first for the Canadian Red Cross in the Balkans and then in the Canadian Expeditionary Force as a medical officer. He also served at several hospitals in Europe, including in Paris and in England.

Paquette returned to Quebec in 1919 and practiced medicine in Mont-Laurier until his entry into municipal politics and his nine-year stint as mayor of that city.

Paquette was first elected to the Legislative Assembly of Quebec for the district of Labelle in the 1935 general election as a member of the Conservative Party.  He was reelected, as a member of the Union Nationale, in all six subsequent elections from 1936 to 1956. Paquette remained as the Legislative Assembly Member for Labelle until he resigned in 1958.

In 1936, he was appointed as the first Minister of Health in the Duplessis Cabinet for the newly created provincial department of health. He served in the position from 1936 to 1939 and again from 1944 to 1958 when the Union Nationale regained power. Establishments made during his tenure as health minister included:
parish clinics for maternal and infant health
mobile tuberculosis screening units
Dr. Armand Frappier's Institut de microbiologie et d'hygiène (today known as the Institut Armand-Frappier) at the Université de Montréal.

In 1958, he was appointed to the Legislative Council of Quebec for the division of Rougemont and resigned in 1967.

In support of Catholicism, he placed crucifixes above the chairs of the speakers in the Legislative Assembly and the Legislative Council.

He received several honours, distinctions and medals, including honorary doctorates for Université Laval, Université de Montréal, and Bishop's College.

Other rewards include:
 1919 - decorated by the Prince of Wales
 1920 - Military Medal of the British government
 Honour Cross of the French government
 1937 - a perpetual member of the Holy Land by the Catholic Church
 1938 a member of the Latin Order (1938)
 1946 - Jerusalem Cross
 1953 - Queen Elizabeth II Coronation Medal
 1967 - Medal of the Canadian Centennial

References
 

1888 births
1978 deaths
Canadian Militia officers
Canadian military personnel of World War I
Canadian Expeditionary Force officers
Physicians from Quebec
Members of the Executive Council of Quebec
People from Montérégie
Conservative Party of Quebec MNAs
Union Nationale (Quebec) MLCs
Union Nationale (Quebec) MNAs
Mayors of places in Quebec
Université Laval alumni